Lepetidae is a family of sea snails or small, deep-water true limpets, marine gastropod molluscs in the clade Patellogastropoda the true limpets.

Taxonomy 
This family consists of the two following subfamilies (according to the taxonomy of the Gastropoda by Bouchet & Rocroi, 2005):
 Lepetinae Gray, 1850
 Propilidiinae Thiele, 1891

A cladogram showing phylogenic relations of Patellogastropoda based on molecular phylogeny research by Nakano & Ozawa (2007):

Genera
Genera in the family Lepetidae include:

Lepetinae
 Bathylepeta Moskalay, 1977    
 Cryptobranchia Middendorff, 1851    
 Iothia Forbes, 1849    
 Lepeta J. E. Gray, 1842    
 Limalepeta Moskalev, 1978 
 Maoricrater Dell, 1956

Propilidiinae
 Propilidium Forbes and Hanley, 1849    
 Sagamilepeta Okutani, 1987

References

External links 
 "Reproduction and development of the limpet Limalepeta lima (Dall, 1918) (Gastropoda: Lepetidae) from Peter the Great Bay, Sea of Japan". 

 
Taxa named by John Edward Gray